Quşçu (also, Kushchi and Kushchu) is a village and municipality in the Shamakhi Rayon of Azerbaijan.  It has a population of 4,097.  The municipality consists of the villages of Quşçu, Laləzar, and Aşkar.

References 

Populated places in Shamakhi District